The Guaduas Formation (K2P1G, K2E1G, KPgg, KTg, TKg, Ktg) is a geological formation of the Middle Magdalena Basin and the Altiplano Cundiboyacense, Eastern Ranges of the Colombian Andes. Fossils of Coussapoa camargoi, Ficus andrewsi, Berhamniphyllum sp. and Archaeopaliurus boyacensis have been found in coalbeds in Zipaquirá and Tasco, Boyacá.

Etymology 
The formation was first described by Hettner in 1894 and named in 1931 by Hubach after Guaduas, Cundinamarca, former northern territory of the Panche.

Description

Lithologies 
The Guaduas Formation consists mainly of shales with intercalated sandstone beds. The formation contains coalbeds that are widely explored in the area. Fossil remains of Coussapoa camargoi, Ficus andrewsi, Berhamniphyllum sp. and Archaeopaliurus boyacensis have been found in coalbeds in Zipaquirá and Tasco, Boyacá.

Stratigraphy and depositional environment 
The Guaduas Formation unconformably overlies the Arenisca Labor-Tierna Formation of the Guadalupe Group and is overlain by the Cacho Formation. The age has been estimated to be Upper Maastrichtian-Lower Paleocene, spanning the K-T boundary. The Guaduas Formation is thicker in Cundinamarca than in Boyacá. This has been explained by a decrease in subsidence and a higher amount of erosion in the northern area of original deposition. The lateral thickness variations are thought to be the result of the movement of the Soapaga Fault. The formation has been deposited in a coastal plain setting.

Outcrops 

The Guaduas Formation is apart from its type locality, found in the Eastern Hills of Bogotá, the Ocetá Páramo and many other locations in the Eastern Ranges, such as Granada, the Dintel Synclinal north of Facatativá, the Suesca Synclinal, east of Junín, and surrounding Lake Tota. The northeast-southwest Canocas Fault crosscuts the Guaduas Formation near San Cayetano. The synclinals of the Río Frío, Neusa, Zipaquirá, Checua-Lenguazaque, Sesquilé, Sisga, Subachoque, Teusacá and Usme and Soacha are composed of the Guaduas Formation. The Suba Hills are entirely composed of the Guaduas Formation. The formation also has outcrops in the Sumapaz Páramo.

Regional correlations

Gallery

See also 

 Geology of the Eastern Hills
 Geology of the Ocetá Páramo
 Geology of the Altiplano Cundiboyacense

Notes and references

Notes

References

Bibliography

Maps

External links 

 

Geologic formations of Colombia
Upper Cretaceous Series of South America
Cretaceous Colombia
Maastrichtian Stage of South America
Cretaceous–Paleogene boundary
Paleocene Series of South America
Paleogene Colombia
Danian Stage
Peligran
Tiupampan
Fossiliferous stratigraphic units of South America
Coal formations
Shale formations
Paludal deposits
Source rock formations
Formations
Formations
Formations
Coal in Colombia